This is a list of mayors of Windsor, Ontario.

Reeve of the Village of Windsor
 S.S. MacDonell - 1851 - 1858

Mayors of the Town of Windsor
 S.S. MacDonell - 1858
 James Dougall - 1859 - 1861
 Mark Richards - 1862 - 1863
 S.S. MacDonell - 1864 - 1867
 James Dougall - 1867 - 1869
 Donald Cameron - 1870 - 1874
 William Scott - 1875
 Robert L. McGregor - 1969
 Charles R. Horne - 1877 - 1879
 John Coventry - 1880 - 1882
 Francis Cleary - 1883 - 1885
 James H. Beattie - 1886 - 1888
 Michael Tworney - 1889
 Solomon White - 1890
 Oscar E. Fleming - 1891

Mayors of the City of Windsor
 Oscar E. Fleming - 1892 - 1893
 James H. Beattie - 1894
 D. Willis Mason - 1895 - 1896
 John Davis - 1897 - 1901
 James F. Smythe - 1902
 John W. Drake - 1903 - 1904
 Ernest S. Wigle - 1905 - 1909
 John W. Hanna - 1910 - 1911
 James H. Shepard - 1912
 Henry Clay - 1913
 Frederick L. Howell - 1914
 Arthur W. Jackson - 1915 - 1916
 Charles R. Tuson - 1917 - 1918
 E. Blake Winter - 1919 - 1920
 Herbert W. Wilson - 1921 - 1923
 Frank J. Mitchell - 1924 - 1926
 Cecil E. Jackson - 1927 - 1930
 David Croll - 1931 - 1934
 George Bennett - 1935 - 1936
 Ernest S. Wigle - 1937 - 1938
 David Croll - 1939 - 1940
 Arthur Reaume - 1941 - 1954
 Thomas R. Brophey - 1950
 Michael Patrick - 1955 - 1964
 John Wheelton - 1965 - 1969
 W.C. Riggs - 1969
 Frank Wansbrough - 1970 - 1974
 Bert Weeks - 1975 - 1982
 Elizabeth Kishkon - 1983 - 1985
 David Burr - 1986 - 1988
 John Millson - 1989 - 1991
 Michael D. Hurst - 1992 - 2003
 Eddie Francis - 2003 - 2014
 Drew Dilkens - 2014 - present

Mayors of Windsor
Windsor, Ontario